A list of films produced in Russia in 1998 (see 1998 in film).

1998

See also
 1998 in Russia

External links

1998
Russia
Films